The International Invitational Wushu Championships, also known as the International Wushu Festivals, were a series of international wushu competitions held from 1985 until the formation of the International Wushu Federation (IWUF) in 1990. These competitions were the first international wushu competitions to exist which proceeded the World Wushu Championships which started in 1991.

Championships

History 
In 1982, the General Administration of Sport of China officially proclaimed that wushu practitioners had a duty 'to promote wushu to the world' with the ultimate goal of wushu becoming an official event at the Olympic Games. Later that year, the Chinese Wushu Association (CWA) hosted a small-scale international wushu tournament. A year later in 1983, Beijing won the bid to host the 1990 Asian Games, the first international multi-sport event to occur in China, and thus there was a greater incentive to internationalize wushu.

The CWA officially hosted the First International Invitational Wushu Championships in Xi'an in 1985. 91 athletes from 14 nations competed. China finished in first place with a clean sweep of 14 gold medals, Japan finished in second with five silver and three bronze medals, Canada and Hong Kong finished in third with two silver medals, and the United States was fourth with six bronze medals. Zhao Changjun and Zhang Hongmei from China captured the male and female all-around titles respectively. At this competition, a preparatory committee for the foundation of the IWUF which was led by the CWA and joined by various individuals and organizations throughout the world.

The CWA hosted the second competition in Tianjin in 1986. The preparatory committee for the Wushu Federation of Asia (WFA) was formed in preparation for the first Asian Wushu Championships in 1987.

The third championships were held in Hangzhou in 1988. Japan, Hong Kong, Singapore, and the United Kingdom grabbed a gold medal each while China won in all the other categories. After the taolu competition, the festival transitioned into the first International Invitational Sanshou Championships which relocated to Shenzhen. China won in four out of the five contested weight categories.

No championships were also held in 1989 as the second Asian championships took place in Hong Kong.

In 1990, the CWA, busy with the formation of the IWUF, gave the Malaysian federation authority to host an international competition in the middle of 1990 which consisted mostly of Asian athletes. Later in 1990, the wushu competition at the 1990 Asian Games took place. On October 3rd, the last day of competition, the IWUF was officially formed and around a year later, the 1991 World Wushu Championships took place in Beijing. In November of the same year, the CWA hosted a second international sanshou competition.

References 

World Wushu Championships
Wushu competitions
Defunct sports competitions in China